Love is not Closed is an Iranian sitcom Series directed by Bijan Birang. In February 2014, the series was cancelled after five episodes.

Storyline 
A young couple on the eve of their seventh wedding anniversary are faced with events that affect their lives and those around them...

Cast 
 Mohammad Reza Golzar
 Mahnaz Afshar
 Shahram Haghighat Doost
 Behnoosh Bakhtiari
 Mehraneh Mahin Torabi
 Xaniar Khosravi
 Alireza Khamseh
 Reza Naji
 Fariba Naderi
 Hadis Mir Amini
 Bahram Shahmohammadloo
 Sina Razani
 Maedeh Tahmasebi
 Hossein Erfanian
 Mahsa Erfanian

References

External links
 

2010s Iranian television series
Iranian television series